The 2012–13 Denver Pioneers men's basketball team represented the University of Denver during the 2012–13 NCAA Division I men's basketball season. The Pioneers, led by sixth year head coach Joe Scott, played their home games at Magness Arena and were first year members of the Western Athletic Conference. This was their only year as a member of the WAC as they joined The Summit League in July 2013.

They finished the season 22–10, 16–2 in WAC play to claim a share of the regular season conference championship with Louisiana Tech. They lost in the quarterfinals of the 2013 WAC tournament to Texas State. They were invited to the 2013 NIT where they defeated Ohio in the first round before losing in the second round to Maryland.

Roster

Schedule
 
|-
!colspan=9| Regular season

|-
!colspan=9| 2013 WAC tournament

|-
!colspan=9| 2013 NIT

References

2012-13
2012–13 Western Athletic Conference men's basketball season
2013 National Invitation Tournament participants
2012 in sports in Colorado
2013 in sports in Colorado